The 2022 NCAA Division II football season, part of college football in the United States organized by the National Collegiate Athletic Association (NCAA) at the Division II level, began on August 31 and ended on December 17 with the Division II championship at the McKinney Independent School District Stadium in McKinney, Texas.

Conference changes and new programs

Conference changes
 Prior to the start of the season, the Great Northwest Athletic Conference announced that it would cease sponsorship of football. The GNAC previously sponsored football in two stints: 2001 to 2006 and 2008 to 2021. The three remaining members, Central Washington, Simon Fraser, and Western Oregon, subsequently joined the Lone Star Conference as football-only affiliated members.

Membership changes

Headlines
 On October 27, 2022, the D-II Presidents Council voted to support a change to redshirt rules that had been proposed by six D-II conferences. Under the proposal, players in their first season of college attendance can play up to three games before losing redshirt status. The proposal will be voted on by the entire D-II football membership at the 2023 NCAA Convention.

Rankings

The top 25 from the AFCA Coaches' Poll.

Preseason Poll

Conference standings

Super Region 1

Super Region 2

Super Region 3

Super Region 4

Postseason

Teams

Bracket

Super Region 1

Super Region 2

Super Region 3

Super Region 4

* - Host school

National semifinals
Teams that advanced to the semifinals were re-seeded.

See also
2022 NCAA Division I FBS football season
2022 NCAA Division I FCS football season
2022 NCAA Division III football season
2022 NAIA football season

References